Mathias Bringaker (born 30 January 1997) is a Norwegian footballer currently playing for Mjøndalen IF in 1. divisjon.

Bringaker was born in Stavanger, but spent his whole youth in Jørpeland. He played for Staal Jørpeland until 2013, where he was picked up by Stavanger-based Viking to represent their youth squad. In 2016, he got his chance with the senior team as he signed his first professional contract at the club. He made his full debut in the Norwegian Premier League coming on as a substitute against Vålerenga  in the 62nd minute. He scored in the 88th minute to put Viking 2–0 up against Vålerenga at Ullevaal Stadion.

Career statistics

Club

References

External links

1997 births
Living people
Sportspeople from Stavanger
People from Strand, Norway
Norwegian footballers
Norway youth international footballers
Association football forwards
Staal Jørpeland IL players
Viking FK players
IK Start players
Sandnes Ulf players
Eliteserien players
Norwegian First Division players